Cycas aenigma is a species of cycad endemic to the Philippines.

Range
Cycas aenigma is known only in cultivation in Puerto Princesa City, Palawan.

References

aenigma
Endemic flora of the Philippines
Plants described in 2008